"The People in Me" is a song by the American garage rock band, The Music Machine, written by Sean Bonniwell, and was first released as a track on their debut album (Turn On) The Music Machine in December 1966 on Original Sound Records. The song was also released as the A-side to the group's second single, which was distributed on January 21, 1967. Like many of Bonniwell's compositions, "The People in Me"'s lyrical content featured a gloomy rebellious mood, with eerie lead vocals by Bonniwell, and it explored with a hard-edged variation of psychedelic rock. It also featured guitarist Mark Landon's wiry distorted guitar melodies, joined by backing vocals near the conclusion of the song.

"The People in Me", with the flip side "Masculine Intutition", was the final Music Machine single to chart on the Billboard Hot 100, where it peaked at number 66. Though it was considered a strong follow-up to their debut release "Talk Talk", the song suffered from inadequate airplay when the band's management angered radio producers for exclusively airing the single on a rival station. Bonniwell would pen much more experimental compositions, but the dispute damaged The Music Machine's prospects for another charting hit.

Personnel

 Sean Bonniwell - lead vocals
 Mark Landon - lead guitar, backing vocals
 Keith Olsen - bass guitar, backing vocals
 Ron Edgar - drums
 Doug Rhodes - keyboards

References

1966 songs
The Music Machine songs
Songs written by Sean Bonniwell